Bogolyubovka is a rural locality (a village) in Konstantinogradovsky Selsoviet, Sterlitamaksky District, Bashkortostan, Russia. The population was 174 as of 2010. There are 3 streets.

Geography 
Bogolyubovka is located 44 km northwest of Sterlitamak (the district's administrative centre) by road. Konstantinogradovka is the nearest rural locality.

References 

Rural localities in Sterlitamaksky District